Jessica Joseph (born March 31, 1982 in Bloomfield Hills, Michigan) is an American former ice dancer. With Charles Butler, she is the 1998 World Junior champion and 1998 U.S. silver medalist. They also competed in the 1998 Winter Olympics. After that partnership ended, she skated with Brandon Forsyth and won a bronze medal at the 2001 Nationals. In 2002, the pair split, and Joseph left competitive skating.

Programs 
(with Forsyth)

Competitive highlights

With Butler

With Forsyth

References

External links

Navigation

1982 births
American female ice dancers
Figure skaters at the 1998 Winter Olympics
Living people
People from Bloomfield Hills, Michigan
Olympic figure skaters of the United States
World Junior Figure Skating Championships medalists
21st-century American women